Bathylasma is a genus of barnacles.

Species 
Species in this genus include.

 Bathylasma alearum
 Bathylasma aucklandicum
 Bathylasma chilense
 Bathylasma corolliforme
 Bathylasma hirsutum
 Bathylasma rangatira

References 

Sessilia
Molluscs described in 1971
Crustacean genera